Hardbakke is the administrative centre of the municipality of Solund in Vestland county, Norway. The village is located on the west side of the island of Sula, just across the strait from the island of Steinsundøyna.  Hardbakke is located about halfway between the islet of Holmebåen and the village of Losnegard, the western- and easternmost points in the municipality. Hardbakke has an elementary school and a secondary school, as well as Solund Church.

References

Villages in Vestland
Solund